De Rachewiltz is a surname. Notable people with the surname include:

Boris de Rachewiltz (1926–1997), Italian Egyptologist
Igor de Rachewiltz (1929–2016), Italian Mongolist
Mary de Rachewiltz (born 1925), American poet and translator, wife of Boris